Julia Catherine Donaldson  (nee Shields; born 16 September 1948) is an English writer and playwright, and the 2011–2013 Children's Laureate. She is best known for her popular rhyming stories for children, especially those illustrated by Axel Scheffler, which include The Gruffalo, Room on the Broom and Stick Man. She originally wrote songs for children's television but has concentrated on writing books since the words of one of her songs, "A Squash and a Squeeze", were made into a children's book in 1993. Of her 184 published works, 64 are widely available in bookshops. The remaining 120 are intended for school use and include her Songbirds phonic reading scheme, which is part of the Oxford University Press's Oxford Reading Tree.

Life and career

Childhood 
Donaldson was born and brought up in Hampstead, London, with her younger sister Mary. The family occupied a Victorian three-storey house near Hampstead Heath. Her parents, sister and their pet cat Geoffrey lived on the ground floor, an aunt and uncle (and later their children, James and Kate) on the first floor and her grandmother on the second floor.

Donaldson's parents, James (always known as Jerry) and Elizabeth, met shortly before the Second World War, which then separated them for six years. Jerry, who had studied Philosophy, Politics, and Economics at Oxford University, spent most of the war in a prisoner-of-war camp where his knowledge of German earned him the position of an interpreter. Elizabeth, also a good German speaker with a degree in languages, meanwhile did war work in the WRNS.

After the war, they were reunited and married, and in 1950 they bought the Hampstead house together with Jerry's mother, his sister Beta and her husband Chris (the two men had met in the P.O.W. camp). When Donaldson was six her father contracted polio and thereafter was confined to a wheelchair, though he still led an active life, working as a lecturer in the Maudsley Hospital's Institute of Psychiatry, where he pioneered genetic studies using the model of identical twins brought up apart.

Elizabeth worked as a part-time secretary and helped her boss, Leslie Minchin, translate German lieder into English. It was a household of music and song: Elizabeth sang with the Hampstead Choral Society, Jerry played the cello in amateur string quartets, and both parents were active members of the Hampstead Music Club. Summer holidays were at Grittleton House in Wiltshire, where Jerry played his cello in a summer school for chamber music, while Julia and Mary romped around and put on musical shows with the other children.

Poetry also featured strongly in Donaldson's early life; she was given The Book of a Thousand Poems by her father when she was five years old, and her grandmother introduced her to Edward Lear’s nonsense rhymes. Donaldson attended New End Primary School and then Camden School for Girls. During her childhood and adolescence she acted (understudying the fairies in Shakespeare's A Midsummer Night's Dream at The Old Vic where she made the acquaintance of a young Judi Dench and Tom Courtenay), sang with the Children's Opera Group, and learned the piano.

A good linguist, she learned French and German at school and later picked up Italian through a summer tutoring job with a family in Naples, so that by the age of 19 she had a good grasp of all three languages.

University life

Donaldson studied Drama and French at Bristol University (1967–1970), graduating with a 2:1 honours degree. During her time there she acted in departmental productions and learnt the guitar. In 1968, she and her friend Maureen Purkis took part in the play I am not the Eiffel Tower with music composed by Colin Sell, an accomplished young pianist who was studying Spanish and Portuguese at Bristol and who has gone on to appear in BBC Radio 4's I'm Sorry I Haven't a Clue. Sell's roommate Malcolm Donaldson, a medical student who played left-handed guitar and was a keen amateur actor, came to see the show and subsequently teamed up with Sell, Donaldson and Purkis to sing in the pubs during Bristol University Rag Week in early 1969. Almost immediately after this Donaldson and Purkis were seconded to live in Paris for six months as part of their degree course where they sang and played their guitars to café audiences for money. Malcolm joined them in the summer and the trio performed various songs by the Beatles and from musicals including Hair.

After several weeks of busking in Paris, Malcolm followed Julia and Maureen to the Avignon Festival. Here his attempts to sleep on their youth hostel floor led to eviction and the trio moved out, sleeping in a camp site and even a field, by which time a deep friendship had been formed. During their time in Paris the group were spotted by a French entrepreneur who auditioned them. While nothing came of this Donaldson and Purkis penned a tune to the traditional French poem "Metamorphosis" specifically for the audition, the first time that Donaldson had composed a song for an occasion (apart from the childhood shows).

By December 1969 Julia and Malcolm had become an item. They began to supply cabaret for the occasional university social event, and in 1970 they visited America, travelling by Greyhound bus from the East to the West coast and busking in Seattle and San Francisco. On their return the duo played in restaurants and began to participate in events as diverse as the Crystal Palace Children's Day, an Easter Parade in London and a dental congress dinner – with Julia Donaldson composing songs specially for these occasions.

1970s

The couple continued to busk in Europe during holidays, including in France and Italy, with Julia Donaldson writing "The French Busking Song" in French, and "The Spaghetti Song" in Italian. By 1971, Donaldson was working in London at Michael Joseph publishers as a secretary to Anthea Joseph but was also given considerable leeway as a junior editor. At weekends she and Malcolm took part in the Bristol Street Theatre, a group of mainly postgraduate students inspired by the late playwright David Illingworth. The group devised simple, unscripted plays which could be performed in the playgrounds of poor council estates and which recruited children from the audience to take over some of the roles. This was to have a lasting effect on Donaldson's interaction with children in her own shows as an established children's writer.

The couple were married in September 1972, Donaldson composing an operetta which she and Malcolm, their best man Colin Sell, the bridesmaids and ushers performed at the reception in Burgh House, Hampstead. A picture of the wedding is on display in the house today. Donaldson then worked as a secretary in Radio Bristol where she also had a weekly slot as short story producer/editor. In August 1974 the couple moved to Brighton where Donaldson had been appointed as editor at Robert Tyndall, a small book publishers. Shortly before this she had sent a tape of songs to BBC Children's Television, and between 1974 and 1978 she wrote regularly for the programme Play Away, her songs being performed by actors and musicians including Toni Arthur, Floella Benjamin, Johnny Ball, Brian Cant, Derek Griffiths and musical director Jonathan Cohen. She also wrote occasional songs for Play School and for the Watch with Mother programme Play Board. Some of Donaldson's songs – "The Luck of the Game", "Funny Face" and "A Squash and a Squeeze" – were recorded at this time for BBC albums.

Julia and Malcolm were involved in the Brighton folk club scene, performing floor spots of comedy songs written by Donaldson, often within days of being composed. The songs were variously influenced by Flanders and Swann, topical affairs and traditional folk tales (the latter inspiring spoofs such as "The Ballad of Jack Nancy and Fred", and "Folk Alphabet"). Their vinyl album First Fourteen(1977) featured many of these songs, while others were included much later on the CD Second Fourteen (2006, when  First Fourteen was also re-mastered as a CD).

Donaldson composed two musicals for children: King Grunt's Cake (1976) and Pirate on the Pier (1980) which she and a small cast performed both in London and Brighton. Influenced by their Bristol Street Theatre experience, Donaldson ran a Saturday-morning workshop for children in Portslade from 1974 to 1976. During these sessions a simple play would be devised, followed by making of props and costumes, rehearsal and then a performance.

In 1977/6 Donaldson studied at Brighton College of Education for a Postgraduate Certificate in Education and worked for two years as an English teacher at St Mary's Hall in Brighton until the arrival of their first child Hamish in 1978, after which she never returned to full-time employment. The couple moved to Lyon in France for a year (1979–80) with Hamish, returning to Brighton where their second son Alastair was born in 1981.

1980s

In 1983 the family of four moved to Bristol where Malcolm Donaldson was appointed as Senior Registrar in Paediatrics to United Bristol Hospitals. By then the television writing had dried up and the folk scene had waned. Julia Donaldson wrote and sang a few topical songs for adult radio programmes (including one about the Guinness Distillers take-over bid, which appeared on Financial World Tonight), did occasional amateur acting and street theatre, and wrote the songs for the Kingsdown community play Nine Trees Shade. She also became a volunteer in Hamish's primary school, hearing the children read aloud. She devised short plays with the right number of parts for a reading group, rotating the roles until each child had read the whole play. The piece would then be performed to the entire class. This approach seemed to build confidence in reading aloud as well as being enjoyable, and Donaldson stored the plays in a drawer for possible future use.

In 1989 Malcolm was appointed to Glasgow University as senior lecturer in child health and the family, now five following the arrival of Jerry in 1987, moved to Bearsden.

1990s

Once in Glasgow, Donaldson 'pitched' once again for song-writing commissions with the BBC. Between 1990 and 1994 she wrote for various programmes including Thinkabout Science (two series) and Playdays, composing songs for presenters and puppets (such as Lizzie and the Whybird) to sing.

In 1991 Donaldson was contacted by Methuen Publishing to ask if the words of her song "A Squash and a Squeeze", which she had written for the BBC's Playboard programme in 1975, could be made into a picture book for children. The book was published in 1993, with illustrations by a German artist Axel Scheffler, who was living in London. Publication of A Squash and a Squeeze was a pivotal event for Donaldson . It made her realise that her song-writing talent could be applied to story-writing, and gave her the confidence to open her drawer of simple plays for schoolchildren and to send some samples to an educational publisher. Between 1993 and 1999 she wrote extensively for Heinemann and Ginn, including plays such as Birthday Surprise for younger classes and Top of the Mops for reluctant teenage readers, as well as re-tellings of traditional tales. During this time Donaldson started visiting Scottish schools and libraries, occasionally accompanied by Malcolm Donaldson and his guitar.

From the 1990s when Donaldson was extensively visiting school and libraries, she extended techniques learned in Bristol and Brighton to encourage children to act and sing with her. Following the publication of The Gruffalo she was invited to book festivals, participating in the Edinburgh International Book Festival every year from 1999 onwards, and appearing regularly at Hay, Cheltenham and Bath festivals, as well as at many theatres.

The Gruffalo

In 1995, while looking for ideas for an educational series of plays based on traditional tales, Donaldson came across a version of a Chinese story about a little girl who escapes being eaten by a tiger by claiming to be the fearsome Queen of the Jungle and inviting him to walk behind her. The tiger misinterprets the terror of the various animals they meet as being related to her rather than him, and flees. Donaldson sensed that this story could be developed into more than an educational item and returned to it later as a possible basis for a picture book. She decided to make the girl a mouse, and chose a fox, owl and snake as woodland rather than jungle creatures but wasn't satisfied with lines like "They ought to know, they really should / There aren't any tigers in this wood".

She then thought of the idea of a monster whose name would end in O (to rhyme with "doesn't he know"). "Gr" sounded suitably fierce as the start to the monster's name, and filling in the middle with "uffal" gave the name Gruffalo, conjuring up the pleasing image of a monster reminiscent of a buffalo but a lot more scary. Even then, The Gruffalo proved nigh impossible to write but, encouraged by her son Alastair, Donaldson persisted with her idea that the monster, rather than existing in the Deep Dark Wood from the outset, should be a figment of the Mouse's imagination, employed to scare off the fox, owl and snake but then turning out to be a reality. A further objection to the original draft was made by Jesse (by now called Jerry) who asked, "Mum, why don't the fox, owl and snake just eat the mouse on the spot?"  This flaw was resolved by inserting the question "Where are you meeting him? (The Gruffalo)" and the reply "Here, by these rocks / And his favourite food is roasted fox", with similar lines for the remaining two predators.

The Gruffalo was sent to Reid Books in 1995.  Donaldson sent the text to Axel Scheffler, whom she had met only once or twice, briefly, following the publication of A Squash and a Squeeze. Within days Macmillan Children's Books made an offer to publish The Gruffalo, which was illustrated by Scheffler and published in 1999.

Post-Gruffalo era

The Gruffalo was an immediate success, going on to win several awards, including the Smarties Prize (1999). It has subsequently been translated into more than 50 languages, sold over 10 million copies worldwide, and has given rise to stage and screen productions by Tall Stories and Magic Light Pictures. The Gruffalo was followed by more Donaldson/Scheffler publications by Macmillan: Monkey Puzzle (2000), Room on the Broom (2001), The Smartest Giant in Town (2002), The Snail and the Whale (2003), The Gruffalo's Child, featuring an only child Gruffalo with a wooden stick doll plus the original cast of Gruffalo, Mouse, Fox, Snake and Owl (2004), and Charlie Cook's Favourite Book (2005). In 2006 Scheffler moved to Alison Green Books who published the duo's Tiddler (2007), Stick Man (2008), Tabby McTat (2009), Zog (2010), The Highway Rat (2011), Superworm (2012), The Scarecrows' Wedding (2014), Zog and the Flying Doctors (2017) and The Smeds and the Smoos (2019).

Since publication of The Gruffalo, Donaldson has worked with other illustrators including Lydia Monks, David Roberts and Nick Sharratt, who has also illustrated two books of poems by Donaldson, Crazy Mayonnaisy Mum  and Wriggle and Roar. Lydia Monks has illustrated the Princess Mirror-Belle trilogy, a series of books for 7- to 10-year-olds about a boastful girl who is the mirror reflection of an ordinary girl called Ellen. The inspiration for Mirror-Belle was Hamish's imaginary childhood friend Sammy, who lived behind a wardrobe mirror.

Donaldson is also the author of The Giants and the Joneses for children aged 8–12 years. Her teenage novel Running on the Cracks is set in Glasgow and traces the adventures of orphaned half-Chinese Leo (aged 15) who is fleeing from her dodgy uncle in England and trying to find her father's estranged family. She befriends a schoolboy called Finlay, who is loosely based on Donaldson's youngest son Jerry during his days as a paper boy.  Running on the Cracks, whose element of mental illness is drawn from Hamish's hospital experiences won the Nasen award in 2011 for its sympathetic and inclusive portrait of Mary, who befriends Leo but then descends into a severe relapse of her bi-polar condition.

Donaldson has also written a phonic reading scheme of short stories comprising 60 books of Songbird Phonics, published by Oxford University Press.

A typical public event consists of acting out (more or less word-for-word) four stories, and singing three or four songs (mostly from Donaldson's three albums of songs – The Gruffalo Song and Other Songs, Room on the Broom and Other Songs and The Gruffalo's Child and Other Songs). There is always a strong element of audience participation, with children (and sometimes their parents) invited on stage to act parts in the stories. Malcolm Donaldson almost always takes part in the events, and they are also often joined by other performers including family members.

Donaldson has also performed jointly with her illustrators, particularly Axel Scheffler and Lydia Monks. She has performed the Donaldson/Scheffler books not only in English but also in German on several tours and at the Berlin Festival. In 2007, when Malcolm took a sabbatical from his job, he joined Julia on a World Tour, acting and singing in Bermuda, New Zealand, Australia, Hong Kong, Singapore, Korea and America.

Laureateship

In 2011, Donaldson was appointed Children's Laureate succeeding the illustrator Anthony Browne. In keeping with her interest in acting and singing Donaldson has set out to encourage children to perform poetry, plays and dramatised readings to generate a love of books and of reading. Accordingly, she has created a series of Plays to Read for six characters to be performed in the classroom, written by herself and by other writers such as Geraldine McCaughrean, Jeanne Willis, Vivian French, Steve Skidmore and Steve Barlow. The first 36 of these plays, for early readers, were published by Pearson (2013) with a further 24 plays for older primary-school children to following later in the year. She has also compiled an anthology of Poems to Perform by groups of children (to be published by Macmillan in 2013) and has created an interactive website called picturebookplays.co.uk which gives guidance as to how selected picture books can be turned into classroom plays.

In her laureate role Donaldson has campaigned passionately against library cuts and closures, writing articles, meeting ministers and – with Malcolm Donaldson – embarking on a 6-week tour of UK libraries in autumn 2012. In all of the 38 libraries the visiting children were requested to perform a short play or song based on a picture book, as well as joining in Donaldson's own stories and songs. The tour was designed to celebrate libraries but also to generate publicity about the plight of some of them.

Personal life

In her 30s, she was diagnosed with “cookie-bite” hearing loss, which leaves a bite-shaped hole in the mid-range of the audible spectrum, making it difficult for her to hear some speech and music, and she is helped by lip reading.

Malcolm Donaldson, Julia's husband, is a retired consultant paediatrician. The couple previously resided in Bearsden, East Dunbartonshire and, in 2014, moved to Steyning, West Sussex. They had three sons, the eldest of whom, Hamish, suffered from Schizoaffective disorder, and took his own life in 2003 at the age of 25. She credits him with inspiring some of her imaginative writings. Their other sons are Alastair, who is Professor of Programming Languages at Imperial College London, and Jerry.  Alastair and Chris, his wife, with their children, Poppy and Felix, sometimes join Julia at her performances for children.

Charity work

Donaldson is a patron of ArtLink Central, a charity which places artists in disadvantaged communities, and of Bookbug, a programme run by the Scottish Book Trust and funded by the Scottish Government, which gifts over 500,000 books to children aged 0–5 in Scotland every year, encouraging parents to share books with their children from birth. In addition she is a patron of Storybook Dads, a UK charity which helps serving prisoners to send recordings of themselves reading bedtime stories to their children in order to maintain connections with some of the 200,000 children affected by parental imprisonment. She is also patron of Monmouth's Savoy Cinema.

Awards, honours and prize 

She was appointed Member of the Order of the British Empire (MBE) in the 2011 Birthday Honours for services to literature. She was promoted to Commander of the Order of the British Empire (CBE) in the 2019 New Year Honours.

She was awarded honorary doctorates by the University of Bristol in 2011 and the University of Glasgow in 2012.
1999 Nestle Smarties Book Prize (Gold Award): The Gruffalo
2000 Blue Peter Best Book to Read Aloud: The Gruffalo
2001 Experian Big Three Award: The Gruffalo
2002 Spoken Book Awards, Children's Audio of the Year: The Gruffalo
2002 Sheffield Book Award: Room on the Broom
2002 Scottish Children's Book Award: Room on the Broom
2002 Stockport Book Award: Room on the Broom
2003 Norfolk Libraries Book Award: Room on the Broom
2003 Blue Peter Best Book to Read Aloud: Room on the Broom
2003 Spoken Book Awards Gold Prize for 6 and under: Room on the Broom
2003 Spoken Book Awards Silver Prize for 6 and under: Monkey Puzzle
2003 Red House Children's Book Award: The Smartest Giant in Town
2003 Sheffield Children's Book Award: The Smartest Giant in Town
2004 Portsmouth Book Awards: The Smartest Giant in Town
2004 Blue Peter Best Book to Read Aloud: The Smartest Giant in Town
2004 Spoken Book Awards Gold Prize for 6 and Under: The Smartest Giant in Town
2004 Book Trust Early Years Award: The Snail and the Whale
2005 Nottingham Book Award: The Smartest Giant in Town
2005 Blue Peter Best Book to Read Aloud: The Snail and the Whale
2005 Spoken Book Awards Gold Prize for 6 and Under Audio: The Snail and the Whale
2005 British Book Awards: The Gruffalo's Child
2007 Giverny Award: The Snail and the Whale
2009 NASEN Book Awards: Running on the Cracks
2010 Galaxy Book Awards: Zog
2011 Stockport Book Award: What the Ladybird Heard
2011 Scottish Children's Book Awards: What the Ladybird Heard
2011 Stockport Book Awards: The Troll
2011 Oxfordshire Book Awards: Zog
2012 Stockport Book Awards: Jack and the Flumflum Tree
2012 Oldham Book Awards: Jack and the Flumflum Tree

Works

References

External links 

 
 Official website of The Gruffalo at Macmillan Children's Books

1948 births
Living people
20th-century English women writers
21st-century English women writers
Alumni of the University of Bristol
Alumni of the University of Edinburgh
British Children's Laureate
Commanders of the Order of the British Empire
Donaldson and Scheffler
English children's writers
People educated at Camden School for Girls
People from Hampstead
Writers from London